Diego Bautista Urbaneja  (December 16, 1782 – January 12, 1856) was a Venezuelan political figure.

Biography
In 1830, when Venezuela achieved independence after the dissolution of Gran Colombia, he became the Minister of Finance in 1830. He became the second Minister of Foreign Affairs of Venezuela after Juan Germán Roscio.

By 1835, the National Library was situated in the convent of the future Palacio de las Academias. Diego Bautista Urbaneja was the first director (c. 1833-35).

The Gran Logia de la Republica de Venezuela or'Grand Lodge of the Republic of Venezuela was founded in 1824, is based in Caracas. After the split between Colombia and Venezuela the Freemasonry in Venezuela Grand Lodge was refounded for Venezuela in 1838. Its first Grand Master was Diego Bautista Urbaneja Sturdy, who had been vice president.

Legacy
The Diego Bautista Urbaneja Municipality is named for him.

See also
List of Ministers of Foreign Affairs of Venezuela
List of people on the postage stamps of Venezuela
Freemasonry in Venezuela

References

 

 

Vice presidents of Venezuela
Venezuelan Ministers of Foreign Affairs
Finance ministers of Venezuela
1782 births
1856 deaths
Burials at the National Pantheon of Venezuela